Lectionary 114, designated by siglum ℓ 114 (in the Gregory-Aland numbering) is a Greek manuscript of the New Testament, on parchment leaves. Palaeographically it has been assigned to the 14th century.

Description 

The codex contains Lessons from the Gospels of John, Matthew, Luke lectionary (Evangelistarium). It is written in Greek minuscule letters, on 180 parchment leaves, in 2 columns per page, 18 lines per page. According to Scrivener the manuscript is magnificently illuminated.

It contains Menologion to few names.

History 

The manuscript was added to the list of New Testament manuscripts by Scholz.

The manuscript is not cited in the critical editions of the Greek New Testament (UBS3).

Currently the codex is located in the Biblioteca Laurentiana (Plutei VI.7) in Florence.

See also 

 List of New Testament lectionaries
 Biblical manuscript
 Textual criticism

Notes and references 

Greek New Testament lectionaries
14th-century biblical manuscripts